Roma was an Italian pre-dreadnought battleship, laid down in 1903, launched in 1907 and completed in 1908. Roma was armed with a main battery of two  guns and twelve  guns.

Roma saw action in the Italo-Turkish War in 1911 and 1912; she took part in the attack on Benghazi, and the amphibious assaults on the islands of Rhodes and the Dodecanese in the Aegean Sea. Roma remained in service during World War I in 1915–1918, but saw no action as a result of the cautious policies of both the Italian and Austro-Hungarian navies. She remained in the Italian inventory until she was stricken from the naval register in September 1926 and was subsequently broken up for scrap.

Design

The design for the Regina Elena class was prepared by the noted naval engineer, Vittorio Cuniberti, then the Chief Engineer of the Italian  (Royal Navy). The first two vessels— and —were ordered for the 1901 fiscal year, and the final pair— and Roma—were authorized the following year.

Characteristics

The ship had a slightly inverted bow and a long forecastle deck that extended past the main mast. She displaced  at full load. Roma had a crew of 742–764 officers and enlisted men.

Her propulsion system consisted of two vertical triple-expansion steam engines, each driving a screw propeller. Steam for the engines was provided by twenty-eight coal-fired Babcock & Wilcox boilers that were vented into three funnels.

As built, the ship was armed with a main battery of two  40-caliber guns placed in two single gun turrets, one forward and one aft. The ship was also equipped with a secondary battery of twelve  45-cal. guns in six twin turrets amidships. Close-range defense against torpedo boats was provided by a battery of twenty-four  40-cal. guns in casemates and pivot mounts. Roma was also equipped with two  torpedo tubes placed in the hull below the waterline.

Roma was protected with Krupp steel manufactured in Terni.

Service history
Roma was laid down at the  shipyard in La Spezia on 20 August 1903 and launched on 21 April 1907. After fitting-out work, the ship was completed on 17 December 1908. After her commissioning, Roma was assigned to the active duty squadron, where she remained through 1910, which included her three sisters and the two s. At the time, these six battleships represented Italy's front-line battle fleet. The active duty squadron was typically in service for seven months of the year for training; the rest of the year they were placed in reserve.

Italo-Turkish War

Italy declared war on the Ottoman Empire in order to seize Libya and other Ottoman holdings in the Mediterranean on 29 September 1911. For the duration of the conflict, Roma served in the 1st Division of the 1st Squadron with her three sister ships, under the command of Vice Admiral Augusto Aubry. On 30 September, Roma, her sister Vittorio Emanuele, and the armored cruiser  conducted a sweep in the Aegean, in the hopes of catching the Turkish training squadron, which was at the time returning from the Levant to Constantinople. Shortly thereafter, Roma, her sister Napoli, and the armored cruisers Pisa and  conducted a blockade of the port of Tripoli.

On 18 October, Roma and the rest of the 1st Division escorted a convoy of eight troopships to Benghazi. The Italian fleet bombarded the city the next morning after the Ottoman garrison refused to surrender. During the bombardment, parties from the ships and the infantry from the troopships went ashore. The Italians quickly forced the Ottomans to withdraw into the city by evening. After a short siege, the Ottoman forces withdrew on 29 October, leaving the city to the Italians. By December, Roma and the other ships of the 1st Squadron were dispersed in the ports of Cyrenaica. Roma remained stationed at Benghazi along with her sister Regina Elena, along with the armored cruiser  and the torpedo cruiser . While there, the ships assisted in the defense of the recently conquered city from Turkish counter-attacks. In early 1912, Roma and the bulk of the fleet withdrew to Italy for maintenance necessary after several months of combat operations. Only a small force of cruisers and light craft was left to patrol the North African coast, since the Ottoman fleet remained confined to port.

The 1st Division left Taranto on 13 April for a demonstration off the Anatolian coast, along with the battleships of the 3rd Division, which had left from Tobruk. The two squadrons met on 17 April off the island of Stampalia, after which the combined fleet steamed north. The following day, the ships cut submarine telegraph cables between Imbros, Tenedos, Lemnos, Salonica, and the Dardanelles. The ships then steamed to the entrance to the Dardanelles in an attempt to lure out the Ottoman fleet. When the Ottoman coastal fortifications began to take the Italian ships under fire, the Italians returned fire and inflicted serious damage on them. On 19 April, Roma and most of the fleet returned to Italy, leaving only Pisa, Amalfi, and a flotilla of torpedo boats to cruise off the Ottoman coast.

On 30 April, the 1st Division again departed from Taranto, bound for the island of Rhodes. Meanwhile, the 3rd Division battleships escorted a convoy of troopships from Tobruk to the island. The Italian heavy ships cruised off the city of Rhodes while the transports landed the expeditionary force  to the south on 4 May; the soldiers quickly advanced on the city, supported by artillery fire from the Italian fleet. The Turks surrendered the city the following day. Between 8 and 20 May, Roma was involved in the seizure of several islands in the Dodecanese between Crete, Rhodes, and Samos. In June, Roma and the rest of the 1st Division was stationed at Rhodes. Over the next two months, the ships cruised in the Aegean to prevent the Turks from attempting to launch their own amphibious operations to retake the islands Italy had seized in May. The 1st Division returned to Italy in late August for repairs and refitting, and were replaced by the battleships of the 2nd Squadron. The 1st Division left port on 14 October, but was recalled later that day, when the Ottomans had agreed to sign a peace treaty to end the war.

World War I

Italy declared neutrality after the outbreak of World War I in August 1914, but by July 1915, the Triple Entente had convinced the Italians to enter the war against the Central Powers with promises of territory acquisition in Italia irredenta. The Austro-Hungarian Navy, which had been Italy's primary rival for decades, was the primary opponent in the conflict. The Austro-Hungarian battle fleet lay in its harbors directly across the narrow Adriatic Sea. Admiral Paolo Thaon di Revel, the Italian naval chief of staff, believed that Austro-Hungarian submarines and minelayers could operate too effectively in the narrow waters of the Adriatic. The threat from these underwater weapons to his capital ships was too serious for him to use the fleet in an active way. Instead, Revel decided to implement blockade at the relatively safer southern end of the Adriatic with the battle fleet, while smaller vessels, such as the MAS boats, conducted raids on Austro-Hungarian ships and installations. Meanwhile, Revel's battleships would be preserved to confront the Austro-Hungarian battle fleet in the event that it sought a decisive engagement. As a result, Roma and her sisters did not see significant action during the war.

For the duration of the conflict, Roma and her three sisters were assigned to the 2nd Division. They spent much of the war rotating between the bases at Taranto, Brindisi, and Valona, but did not see combat. On 14–15 May 1917, three light cruisers of the Austro-Hungarian Navy raided the Otranto Barrage; in the ensuing Battle of the Strait of Otranto, Roma and her sisters raised steam to assist the Allied warships, but the Italian commander refused to permit them to join the battle for fear of risking their loss in the submarine-infested Adriatic.

In November 1918, Roma participated in the occupation of Constantinople following the surrender of the Ottomans. She and Agordat joined a fleet of British, French, and Greek warships that entered the Dardanelles and landed troops to occupy the city. The world's major navies, including Italy, signed the Washington Naval Treaty in early 1922 in an effort to stop naval arms races, which were seen as one of the causes of the Great War. According to the terms of the treaty, Italy could keep Roma and her three sisters, along with the newer dreadnought battleships. Due to the small size and age of the ships the Italians could have kept the ships in service indefinitely. They could not, however, be replaced by new battleships under the normal practice of the Treaty system, which provided for replacements after a ship was 20 years old. Roma was retained for only a few years after the signing of the treaty. On 3 September 1926, Roma was stricken from the naval register and subsequently broken up for scrap.

Footnotes

Notes

Citations

References

Further reading

External links

 Roma (1907) Marina Militare website

Regina Elena-class battleships
World War I battleships of Italy
1907 ships
Ships built in La Spezia